Michele Fitzgerald (born May 5, 1990) is an American travel consultant best known for competing on the reality competition show Survivor.  She was voted the winner of the show's 32nd season, Survivor: Kaôh Rōng, on May 18, 2016. Michele also competed on the show's 40th season, Survivor: Winners at War where she became the 2nd runner-up.

Early life
Fitzgerald grew up in Freehold Township, New Jersey.  She attended Freehold High School, in Freehold Borough, then enrolled at Montclair State University, where she earned a Bachelor of Arts degree in communications studies.  Her parents are Ralph and Linda Fitzgerald; she also has a sister named Kim, and a brother named Joe.

Television Appearances

Survivor

Kaôh Rōng
In 2015, Fitzgerald was selected as one of 18 castaways to compete on Survivor: Kaôh Rōng, the 32nd season of Survivor. Though Kaôh Rōng was the 32nd season to air, it was the 31st filmed, having been shot before Survivor: Cambodia, which aired first; the two seasons were filmed back-to-back in the same location. As the theme of the season was Brains vs. Brawn vs. Beauty, she was assigned to "Beauty" and thus placed on the Gondol tribe at the very start.  On Day 12, the tribes were reshuffled, and she ended up moving to the Chan Loh tribe, along with fellow Beauty Nick Maiorano. By Day 17, the tribes had merged, and both she and Maiorano had to decide whether to align with the former Brains or the former Brawns.  They chose to align with Cydney Gillon, Kyle Jason, and Scot Pollard (the Brawns).

On Day 19, the first post-merge Tribal Council was canceled when fellow castaway Neal Gottlieb was medically evacuated that afternoon. On Day 22, Fitzgerald and Maiorano each attended their first Tribal Council of the game.  They had been able to avoid going to Tribal Council before the merge by always being on a tribe that won immunity. At her first Tribal Council, she joined the other women and Joe Del Campo in voting out Maiorano in a blindside.  At the next vote, Debbie Wanner was voted out by all the other women, including Fitzgerald.  On Day 27, Pollard was blindsided, even though Fitzgerald and Julia Sokolowski were unaware of the plan to blindside Pollard. When Fitzgerald and Gillon won the next reward, they brought Aubry Bracco with them so that they could reconcile and reaffirm their alliance.

At the Final Four Tribal Council, she tried to eliminate Bracco, who tied with Gillon on votes; Bracco would then defeat Gillon in the fire-making tiebreaker.  The Final Three's last challenge would not be for immunity, as expected.  Rather, it would be for a special reward — the right to vote one person off the jury. Fitzgerald won that challenge over fellow finalists Bracco and Trang, and she voted to send Gottlieb off the jury later that night. In his parting words, Gottlieb declared that Fitzgerald probably wasn't going to win.

At the Final Tribal Council, Fitzgerald was criticized for her perceived weakness at the start of the game but praised for getting stronger as the game progressed.  In the end, Fitzgerald won the title of Sole Survivor with five votes, from Wanner, Pollard, Sokolowski, Jason, and Gillon; Bracco received two votes and Trang received zero.

As a result of her victory, Fitzgerald became the first Survivor winner to be born in the 1990s.

Winners at War
For winning Survivor: Kaôh Rōng, she returned to compete on Survivor: Winners at War. Starting on the Sele tribe, Michele found herself going to Tribal Council three times, but found herself in a comfortable position. She helped orchestrate the eliminations of fellow winners Danni Boatwright and Ethan Zohn. When the tribes reshuffled, Fitzgerald remained on Sele alongside fellow tribemate Parvati Shallow. While they were outnumbered 3-2 by the original Dakal's and Shallow would be voted out on Day 16, Fitzgerald would survive the next two Tribal Councils, which allowed her to make the merge.

Fitzgerald found herself on the outs and wrong side of the votes for most of the merge. On day 22, Shallow and Boatwright, who were on Edge of Extinction sent Fitzgerald an advantage, that would give her the chance to flip a coin for immediate immunity at any Tribal Council up until the Final Seven. On Day 29 she gave her advantage to her ally Jeremy Collins for him to save himself at Tribal Council, but he decided not to use it and returned the advantage to her following Tribal Council. She used the advantage at the Final Seven. When she flipped the coin, it landed on "safe," making her immune for the vote. On Day 34, Fitzgerald was targeted by Tony Vlachos' alliance, but she saved herself by winning her first immunity challenge of the season. On Day 36, Fitzgerald came from behind to win her second immunity challenge. On Day 37, she received votes from Vlachos and Ben Driebergen, but was spared and Driebergen was voted out. When Natalie Anderson won the Final Immunity Challenge, she decided to bring Fitzgerald to the end.

By making it to the end, Fitzgerald became the only person in Survivor history to play multiple seasons, win, and never be voted out. She also became only the second returning winner in the show's history not to be voted out after Jenna Morasca, who quit Survivor All-Stars due to a family emergency. At the Final Tribal Council, while Fitzgerald was commended for playing from the bottom,the jury focused most of their attention on Vlachos and Anderson. Fitzgerald ended with zero votes to win, losing to Vlachos, who would win in a 12-4-0 vote.

The Challenge
In 2021, Fitzgerald competed on the thirty-seventh season of The Challenge titled Spies, Lies & Allies. She was voted into the first elimination round alongside Corey Lay where they defeated opponents Michaela Bradshaw and Renan Hellemans. Fitzgerald and Lay were voted into elimination again in episode 4, and were eliminated after they lost against Amber Borzotra and Hughie Maughan.

In 2022, Fitzgerald returned for the show's thirty-eighth season titled Ride or Dies with Survivor: Millennials vs. Gen X alumnus Jay Starrett as her partner.

Career
Fitzgerald had been working as a bartender at the time she started on Survivor.  Before that, she also worked as a caterer, and as an intern with Rock the Earth, an organization that goes to various music events to raise awareness of environmental issues.  At the time she was crowned Sole Survivor, she was working as a travel agent.

Filmography

Television

References

1990 births
Living people
Freehold High School alumni
Montclair State University alumni
Winners in the Survivor franchise
People from Freehold Township, New Jersey
Survivor (American TV series) winners
The Challenge (TV series) contestants